Sarjub (also Romanized as Sarjūb and Sarjoob; also known as Sarchūb) is a village in Damen Rural District, in the Central District of Iranshahr County, Sistan and Baluchestan Province, Iran. At the 2006 census, its population was 872, in 154 families.

References 

Populated places in Iranshahr County